Dead End is the sixth studio album by the Polish heavy metal band Turbo. It was released in 1990 in the United Kingdom through Under One Flag. The album was recorded in 1990, at Giełda studio, Poznań. The cover art was created by Jerzy Kurczak and photographs by Jacek Sroka.

Track listing

Personnel
 Turbo
Robert "Litza" Friedrich – vocal, guitar
Wojciech Hoffmann – guitar
Tomasz Olszewski – bass guitar
Tomasz Goehs – drums
Tomasz Dziubiński - producer
Piotr "MaDcs" Madziar - engineering
Jacek Frączek - assistant
Jerzy Kurczak - artwork
Jacek Sroka - photography

Release history

References

1990 albums
Turbo (Polish band) albums